Cymbals is an album by guitarist Vinicius Cantuária.

Music and recording
Cantuária produced the album. He also wrote or co-wrote nine of the compositions.
The album was recorded in New York and released in 2008.

Reception
The Guardian's reviewer commented that "You could trawl through acres of supposedly 'sexy' Brazil chill albums without finding tracks as good as the 11 songs on this entirely delightful album". The AllMusic reviewer concluded that, "For all of its originality and innovation, and its juxtaposition of traditions and integration of melodies and genres, Cymbals is far from a difficult listen."

Track listing
"Galope"
"Voce E Eu"
"Chuva"
"Vivo Sonhando"
"Voce Esta Sumindo"
"Prantos"
"O Batuque"
"Ominara"
"Tua Cara"
"Champs De Mars"
"To You"

Personnel
 Vinicius Cantuária – guitar, percussion
 Brad Mehldau – piano
 Marc Ribot – guitar
 Jenny Scheinman – violin
 Erik Friedlander – cello
 David Binney – alto saxophone
 Marivaldo Dos Santos – percussion

References

2008 albums
Naïve Records albums
Vinicius Cantuária albums